Pleurota marginella is a moth of the family Oecophoridae. It is found in Germany, Austria, Switzerland, the Czech Republic, Slovakia, Italy, Croatia, Hungary, Romania and Greece, as well as in North Africa.

References

Moths described in 1775
Oecophoridae